Taste of Love may refer to:

Taste of Love (Nigerian TV series), 2014–16 drama series
Taste of Love (Singaporean TV series), 2008 drama series
Taste of Love (South Korean TV series), 2018–19 reality show
Taste of Love (Taiwanese TV series), 2015–16 drama series
Taste of Love (EP), 2021 EP by Twice

See also 
Love Clinic (Hangul: 연애의 맛; RR: Yeonae-ui Mat; lit. The Taste of Love), a 2015 South Korean film
"First Taste of Love", a 1960 song by Ben E. King
"Need a Little Taste of Love", from the 2007 album The Very Best of The Doobie Brothers
Dolunay (2017) (entitled Taste of Love in the Philippines), a 2017 Turkish drama series